Hamro Patro  is a Nepali calendar app for smartphones. As of 2022, it had been downloaded more than ten million times.It provides additional features including news, horoscope, foreign exchange rates, podcasts and Nepali FM radio stations.

It was first launched in 2010.

References

Information technology in Nepal
Android (operating system) software
Calendaring software
2010 establishments in Nepal